The Caliente Range is a west-east trending zone of uplift mountains in the California Coast Ranges, in central California.

Geology

The range is an anticlinal structure with a sharp southern boundary defined by the Morales Thrust Fault, along which runs the Cuyama River.  The Cuyama Valley separates the Caliente Range from the  Sierra Madre Mountains in neighboring Santa Barbara County to the south.  To the northeast, the range is bounded by the Carrizo Plain.  To the northwest, the range is abutted by the La Panza and Santa Lucia Ranges, two northwest-southeast trending units of the Pacific Coast Ranges.

The rocks of the Caliente range are dominated by marine and terrestrial sedimentary deposits laid down over the last 30 million years.  Within them are some volcanic units, prominent particularly in the foothills beginning at the Carrizo Plain.  These volcanic rocks are of Tertiary age, and are mostly basalt.

Land use and accessibility
Most of the Caliente Range is public land, owned and managed by the Bureau of Land Management.  Portions are privately owned, and some of the foothills in the northeast are within the protection of the Carrizo Plain National Monument.

The peak is accessible to non-motorized traffic via a gated road. The skeleton of an old cabin remains on the peak. This cabin was a lookout point during the Second World War, as an observer on this prominent peak would have been able to see and report Japanese airplanes coming inland to bomb the important oil fields in Kern County.

Climate
The higher peaks of the range get more precipitation than the lowlands due to orographic lift of passing storms. Some snow falls on the highest parts of the range.

References

 Charles W. Jennings and Rudolph G. Strand.  Geologic Map of California, Los Angeles Sheet.  State of California, Division of Mines and Geology.  1969.

California Coast Ranges
Mountain ranges of San Luis Obispo County, California
Bureau of Land Management areas in California
Cuyama Valley